Georg Bydlinski (born 30 May 1956 in Graz) is an Austrian writer.

Life 

After studying English literature and religious instruction, Bydlinski has lived as a freelance writer in Mödling since 1982. In 1990, he participated at the Festival of German-Language Literature in Klagenfurt.

He has written many novels, children's books and poems, co-founded a small publishing house, and is an editor of anthologies as well as a translator.

Georg Bydlinski is a member of "IG Autorinnen Autoren", Grazer Autorenversammlung, Österreichischer Schriftstellerverband, "Literaturkreis Podium" and "Friedrich-Bödecker-Kreis Hannover".

Since 2013 he has been working together with the producer Thomas Raber.

Awards 

 1982 "Theodor-Körner-Förderpreis" (Theodor Körner Young Writers Award)
 1987 "Theodor-Körner-Förderpreis"
 1993 "Theodor-Körner-Förderpreis"
 1993 "Kinderbuchpreis der Stadt Wien" (Children's Book Prize of the City of Vienna)
 2001 "Österreichischer Staatspreis für Kinderlyrik" (Austrian State Prize for Children's Poetry)
 2005 "Österreichischer Staatspreis für Kinder- und Jugendliteratur" (Austrian State Prize for Children's Books)
 2005 "Dulzinea-Lyrikpreis" (Dulzinea Poetry Award)

Books

 Pimpel und Pompel aus Limonadien, Vienna u. a. 1980
 Distelblüte, Wean u. a. 1981
 Das Entchen und der große Gungatz, Vienna u. a. 1981 (together with Käthe Recheis und Alicia Sancha)
 Der Mond heißt heute Michel, Vienna u. a. 1981
 Die Sprache bewohnen, Vienna u. a. 1981
 Hinwendung zu den Steinen, Vienna u. a. 1984
 Schritte, St. Georgen an d. Gusen 1984
 ... Weil wir Heinzelmännchen sind, Vienna u. a. 1984 (together with Piotr Stolarczyk)
 Kopf gegen Beton, Mödling 1986
 Der himbeerrote Drache, Vienna 1988 (together with Piotr Stolarczyk)
 Landregen, Vienna u. a. 1988
 Satellitenstadt, Baden-Baden 1988
 Was sich Gott alles ausgedacht hat, Düsseldorf 1988 (together with Brigitte Smith)
 Ein Krokodil geht in die Stadt, Vienna u. a. 1990 (together with Piotr Stolarczyk)
 Guten Morgen, die Nacht ist vorbei, Vienna 1991 (together with Winfried Opgenoorth)
 Im Halblicht, Vienna 1991
 Wurfparabel, Vienna 1991
 Die bunte Brücke, Freiburg u. a. 1992
 Der Hinzel-Henzel-Hunzelmann, Vienna 1992
 Ein Krokodil entdeckt die Nacht, Vienna 1992
 Der Schattenspringer und das Monster, Vienna 1993
 Krok bleibt am Ball, Vienna 1994 (together with Piotr Stolarczyk)
 Bärenschüler, Vienna u. a. 1995 (together with Franz Hoffmann)
 Das Gespenst im Badezimmer, Vienna 1995
 Katzenpostamt, Vienna u. a. 1995 (together with Franz Hoffmann)
 Tierfeuerwehr, Vienna u. a. 1995 (together with Franz Hoffmann)
 Vogelzirkus, Vienna u. a. 1995 (together with Franz Hoffmann)
 Wintergras, Mödling 1995
 Die 3 Streithasen, Vienna 1996 (together with Marianne Bors)
 Affentheater, Vienna u. a. 1997 (together with Franz Hoffmann)
 Hasenfußball, Vienna u. a. 1997 (together with Franz Hoffmann)
 Hundepolizei, Vienna u. a. 1997 (together with Franz Hoffmann)
 Krok geht in die Schule, Esslingen u. a. 1997 (together with Piotr Stolarczyk)
 Schweinchenexpress, Vienna u. a. 1997 (together with Franz Hoffmann)
 Immer diese Nervensägen!, Vienna 1998
 Bald bist du wieder gesund, Vienna u. a. 1999 (together with Birgit Antoni)
 Zimmer aus Licht, Vienna 1999
 Daniel hilft wie ein Großer, Vienna u. a. 2000 (together with Birgit Antoni)
 Der dicke Kater Pegasus, Vienna 2000 (together with Carola Holland)
 Höre mich, auch wenn ich nicht rufe, Nettetal 2000
 Schneefänger, Vienna 2001
 Stadt, Rand, Nacht, Vienna 2002
 Wasserhahn und Wasserhenne, Vienna 2002
 Sieben auf der Suche, Vienna 2003
 Lindas Blues, St. Pölten 2004
 Der Zapperdockel und der Wok, Vienna 2004 (together with Jens Rassmus)
 Ein Gürteltier mit Hosenträgern, Vienna 2005
 Hier ist alles irgendwie anders, Vienna u. a. 2005 (together with Birgit Antoni)
 Schattenschaukel, Vienna 2006
 Wie ein Fisch, der fliegt, Vienna 2006
 Das kleine Buch für gute Freunde, Düsseldorf 2007 (together with Katharina Bußhoff)
 Das kleine Buch zum Trösten, Düsseldorf 2007
 Die Bibel für Kinder und ihre Erwachsenen, Hörbuch, Vienna 2011 (together with Birgit Bydlinski)

Editorship 

 Weißt du, daß die Bäume reden, Vienna u. a. 1983 (together with Käthe Recheis)
 Der Wünschelbaum, Vienna u. a. 1984
 Freundschaft mit der Erde, Vienna u. a. 1985 (together with Käthe Recheis)
 Mödlinger Lesebuch, Mödling 1985
 Angst hat keine Flügel, Mödling 1987
 Auch das Gras hat ein Lied, Vienna u. a. 1988 (together with mit Käthe Recheis)
 Die Erde ist eine Trommel, Freiburg u. a. 1988 (together with Käthe Recheis)
 Unter der Wärme des Schnees, Mödling u. a. 1988 (together with Franz M. Rinner)
 Zieh einen Kreis aus Gedanken, Vienna 1990 (together with Käthe Recheis)
 Ich höre deine Stimme im Wind, Freiburg im Breisgau u. a. 1994 (together with Käthe Recheis)
 Übermalung der Finsternis, Mödling u. a. 1994 (together with Franz M. Rinner)
 Kreisender Adler, singender Stern, Munich u. a. 1996 (together with Käthe Recheis)
 Der neue Wünschelbaum, Vienna 1999

Translations 

 Guck-Guck, Vienna u. a. 1996 (together with Debi Gliori)
 Gute Nacht, Vienna u. a. 1996 (together with Debi Gliori)
 Ich hab dich lieb, Vienna u. a. 1996 (together with Debi Gliori)
 Ein Löffel für dich, Vienna u. a. 1996 (together with Debi Gliori)

References

External links
 http://www.georg-bydlinski.at
 http://www.literaturhaus.at/autoren/B/G-Bydlinski/bio.html
 

Austrian male poets
1956 births
Living people
Writers from Graz